Julia Emma Greville (born 18 February 1979) is an Australian middle-distance freestyle swimmer who won a bronze medal in the 4×200-metre freestyle relay at the 1996 Summer Olympics.

Coming from Perth, Western Australia, Greville emerged onto the scene in 1995, winning the 200-metre freestyle at the Australian Championships and going on to win a silver medal in the 4×200-metre freestyle relay at the 1995 Pan Pacific Championships in Atlanta, Georgia.  At the Atlanta Olympics the following year, Greville reached the final of the 200-metre freestyle, as well as collecting a bronze medal in the 4×200-metre freestyle relay, alongside Susie O'Neill, Nicole Stevenson and Emma Johnson.

Greville's emergence was complete when she claimed a bronze medal in the 200-metre freestyle at the 1998 FINA World Championships in Perth, as well as the relay event. However, aside from a relay gold medal in the 4×200-metre freestyle relay, she failed to medal at the 1998 Commonwealth Games in Kuala Lumpur, Malaysia.

In 1999, Greville sustained a shoulder injury from a car accident. Due to this injury, Greville withdrew from the 1999 Pan Pacific Games in order to surgically repair her shoulder. Five weeks from Olympic Trials Greville's shoulder failed. Greville swam trials with an injured shoulder missing selection for the 2000 Summer Olympics.

See also
 List of Olympic medalists in swimming (women)
 List of World Aquatics Championships medalists in swimming (women)

References

1979 births
Living people
Olympic swimmers of Australia
Swimmers from Perth, Western Australia
Swimmers at the 1996 Summer Olympics
Olympic bronze medalists for Australia
Commonwealth Games gold medallists for Australia
Olympic bronze medalists in swimming
Australian female freestyle swimmers
World Aquatics Championships medalists in swimming
Medalists at the FINA World Swimming Championships (25 m)
Medalists at the 1996 Summer Olympics
Swimmers at the 1998 Commonwealth Games
Commonwealth Games medallists in swimming
Medallists at the 1998 Commonwealth Games